Alex Mann may refer to:
 Alex Mann (bobsleigh)
 Alex Mann (rugby union)

See also
 Alexander Mann, Scottish painter
 Alexander Mann (bishop), American bishop